Carlos Alvarenga (born 23 September 1982) is a Paraguayan footballer who played for clubs including Sport Huancayo of the Primera División in Peru.

References
 

1982 births
Living people
Paraguayan footballers
Paraguayan expatriate footballers
Sportivo Luqueño players
Club Sol de América footballers
12 de Octubre Football Club players
Sport Huancayo footballers
Club San José players
Universitario de Sucre footballers
Expatriate footballers in Bolivia
Expatriate footballers in Peru
Association football defenders